Alunișul may refer to several villages in Romania:

 Alunișul, a village in Zagra Commune, Bistrița-Năsăud County
 Alunișul, a village in Husnicioara Commune, Mehedinți County

See also
Aluniș (disambiguation)
Alunișu (disambiguation)